Parkfield High School was a secondary school located in Wolverhampton, West Midlands, England.

Opened in April 1962, it was situated in the Parkfield area which has been administratively part of Wolverhampton since 1966, having previously been on the northern edge of the Urban District of Coseley.  The school served the neighbourhoods of Lanesfield, Woodcross, and Ettingshall. It was built during the 1960s, with extensions following during the 1970s, and around 1980 the main building was extensively renovated due to mining subsidence.  The school replaced the former Manor Secondary School near Woodcross, Coseley.

The last headmaster before the school was succeeded by South Wolverhampton and Bilston Academy was Mr Arthur Thompson, who retired in July 2009. The two sites which Parkfields maintained joined together on the Wolverhampton Road East site from September 2009. The school closed on 31 August 2009.

Notable alumni

Bill Etheridge, UK Independence Party MEP

References

Defunct schools in Wolverhampton
Educational institutions established in 1962
1962 establishments in England
Educational institutions disestablished in 2009
2009 disestablishments in England